Sheila Black, an American poet, has written over 40 books for children and young adults as well as four poetry collections. She was a 2000: U.S. co-winner of the Frost-Pellicer Frontera Prize, and a 2012 Witter Bynner Fellowship.

Life 
She graduated from Barnard College and received her master's degree from the University of Montana.
. Teaching part-time at New Mexico State University and also working as Development Director for the Colonias Development Council, Sheila Black continues to write poetry, recently becoming co-editor of Beauty Is A Verb: The New Poetry of Disability with Jennifer Bartlett and Mike Northen. Sheila Black was diagnosed with XLH, commonly referred to as Vitamin-D Resistant Rickets, at a young age. Black continues to advocate for equal rights for persons with disabilities. She has three children and lives with her husband in Texas.

Style

Confessional poetry 
In her poems, Sheila Black writes in a confessional style, often referencing past conflicts that resulted from her diagnosis of XLH, such as in her poem What You Mourn. According to Sheila Black,

Reviews 
 On Love/Iraq:

On House of Bone:

Selected works

Poetry collections 
 House of Bone. CW Press. Poems.; Wordtech Communications, 2007, 
 Love/Iraq. CW Press. Poems.; WordTech Communications, 2009,

Poetry collections, collaborative 
 Continental Drift, with Michelle Marcoux. Patriothall, Edinburgh, UK. Poems, Paintings.

Poetry collections, co-editor 
 . Poems.

Children's books 
My Very Own Tooth Fairy Pillow, Random House Children's Books, 1990, 
Patrick the Pup, Andrews and McMeel/Ariel Books, 1996, 
Will the Real Ms. X Please Report to the Principal!, Troll, 1998, 
Me and Maya, the super brain, McGraw-Hill School Division, 2000, 
 Lassie (1994), Puffin High Flyer, Troll,

References

External links 

 
 http://krwg.org/post/interview-poet-sheila-black
 http://www.blackbird.vcu.edu/v2n1/poetry/black_s/land.htm

Poets from New Mexico
Living people
Writers from New Mexico
Year of birth missing (living people)
University of Montana alumni
Barnard College alumni
New Mexico State University faculty
Place of birth missing (living people)
American women poets
American women academics
21st-century American women